Angel Eyes is an album by saxophonist Gene Ammons compiling sessions recorded in 1960 and 1962 and released on the Prestige label in 1965.

Reception
Allmusic awarded the album 4 stars with its review by Scott Yanow stating, "Music from two different occasions are combined on this CD reissue... The latter set was one of Ammons' final ones before serving a long prison sentence (drug-related), yet his interpretations are full of optimism. Recommended".

Track listing 
 "Gettin' Around" (Gene Ammons) – 6:46     
 "Blue Room" (Lorenz Hart, Richard Rodgers) – 5:34     
 "You Go to My Head" (J. Fred Coots, Haven Gillespie) – 5:55     
 "Angel Eyes" (Earl Brent, Matt Dennis) – 8:45     
 "Water Jug" (Frank Wess) – 5:10     
 "It's the Talk of the Town" (Jerry Livingston, Al J. Neiburg, Marty Symes) – 4:15

Note
Recorded at Van Gelder Studio in Englewood Cliffs New Jersey on June 17, 1960 (tracks 1, 2, 4 & 5) and September 5, 1962 (tracks 3 & 6)

Personnel 
Gene Ammons – tenor saxophone
Frank Wess – flute, (tracks 1, 2 and 4) – tenor saxophone, (track 5)
Johnny "Hammond" Smith – organ (tracks 1, 2, 4 & 5)
Mal Waldron (tracks 3 & 6) – piano
Doug Watkins (tracks 1, 2, 4 & 5), Wendell Marshall (tracks 3 & 6) – bass
Art Taylor (tracks 1, 2, 4 & 5), Ed Thigpen (tracks 3 & 6) – drums

References 

Gene Ammons albums
1965 albums
Prestige Records albums
Albums recorded at Van Gelder Studio
Albums produced by Esmond Edwards